The 1989–90 Israel State Cup (Gvia HaMedina) was the 51st season of Israel's nationwide football cup competition and the 36th after the Israeli Declaration of Independence.

The competition was won by Hapoel Kfar Saba who have beaten Shimshon Tel Aviv 1–0 in the final.

Results

Seventh Round

Eighth Round

Byes: Hapoel Bat Yam, Hapoel Lod, Hapoel Yeruham, Maccabi Jaffa.

Round of 16

|}

Quarter-finals

|}

Semi-finals

Final

References
100 Years of Football 1906-2006, Elisha Shohat (Israel), 2006, p. 280
 The seventh round Haaretz, January 1990, cs.bgu.ac.il 
 Hapoel Hadera - Hapoel Tel Aviv 0-1 Haaretz, January 1990, cs.bgu.ac.il 
 Eighth round Haaretz, January 1990, cs.bgu.ac.il 
 Cup fixtures (Football) 1989/90 Wikipoel 
 Fixtures Maccabi Tel Aviv 
 Search results of matches for the 1990/1991 season at the State Cup Maccabi Haifa 
 1989/1990 season Bnei Yehuda Museum 
 Maccabi Yavne - Hapoel Jerusalem 3-1 Haaretz, January 1990, cs.bgu.ac.il 
 All the matches in the State Cup Elisha Shohat, HaMakhtesh 
 Statistics - The 80's Hapoel Kfar Saba 
 1989/1990 season dolphinim.net 
  Maccabi Ramat Amidar - Maccabi Netanya 0-2 Haaretz, January 1990, cs.bgu.ac.il 
 Two postponed matches Haaretz, February 1990, cs.bgu.ac.il 
 Shimshon Tel Aviv is the 16th team Haaretz, February 1990, cs.bgu.ac.il 

Israel State Cup
State Cup
Israel State Cup seasons